The Bridger Mountains are a short subrange of the Rocky Mountains, approximately  long, in central Wyoming in the United States. The range forms a bridge between the Owl Creek Mountains to the west and the southern end of the Bighorn Mountains to the east. The Wind River passes through the gap between the range and the Owl Creek Mountains. Bridger Creek passes through the gap between the range and the Bighorns.

The range is named after Jim Bridger, who pioneered the Bridger Trail through the mountains from southern Wyoming into the Bighorn Basin in 1864. Bates Creek in the eastern part of the range is the location of Bates Battlefield, a significant battle on July 4, 1874, in which the U.S. Army soldiers from Camp Brown (Today's Fort Washakie) with 167 Shoshone scouts attacked the village of Chief Black Coal (Northern Arapaho), killing at least 34 Northern Arapahos.

See also
 List of mountain ranges in Wyoming

Notes

Mountain ranges of Wyoming
Landforms of Hot Springs County, Wyoming